SQ6 may refer to:

Space Quest 6, a video game
SQ6, an early mixtape released by Lil Wayne in 2003
Singapore Airlines Flight 006